Bucculatrix sororcula is a moth in the family Bucculatricidae. It is found in North America, where it has been recorded from Arizona and California. It was first described by Annette Frances Braun in 1963.

References

External Links 
Natural History Museum Lepidoptera generic names catalog

Bucculatricidae
Moths described in 1963
Moths of North America
Taxa named by Annette Frances Braun